FACS or FaCS may refer to:

Organizations

Australia
 Department of Family and Community Services (Australia), an Australian Government department (1998–2006)
 Family and Community Services (South Australia), a former South Australian Government agency
 New South Wales Department of Family and Community Services, a former New South Wales Government Department (2011–2019)

Elsewhere
 First Assembly Christian School, Memphis, Tennessee
 Formal Aspects of Computing Science, a British Computer Society Specialist Group

Post-nominal titles
 Fellow of the Australian Computer Society
 Fellow of the American College of Surgeons

Science and technology
 Fluorescence-activated cell sorting, applied in flow cytometry
 Facial Action Coding System, a procedure to systematically describe human facial expressions (successfully adapted for several other species)
 Families and Children Study, a longitudinal study in Great Britain

Other uses
 Family and consumer science,  a field of study that deals with the economics and management of the home, family and community